Thierry Alibert is a professional rugby league referee.

Alibert is a full-time professional referee, under jurisdiction from the Rugby Football League, and currently takes charge of Super League games, as well as selected Challenge Cup and international games as one of the Rugby Football League's Full Time Match Officials.  Alibert got his opportunity to step up to full-time professionalism with the return of the referee Ashley Klein to his native Australia.

He has refereed in two Rugby League World Cup group matches, in 2000 and 2008. He was put forward as a neutral referee for the Four Nations match between England and Australia on 31 October 2009. However, the Australian Rugby League stated their desire for a more experienced referee, and the match was officiated upon by England's Steve Ganson.

Rugby League World Cup 

2000
 England 66-10 Fiji
 Wales 38-6 Cook Islands

2008

 Ireland 38-20 Samoa
 Samoa 42-10 France

International 
Thierry has refereed: 
 Wales vs England on 17 October 2009.
 He has refereed Lebanon vs Italy on 24 October 2009 in the Rugby League European Cup.
 He has refereed Wales vs Ireland on 1 November 2009 in the Rugby League European Cup.
 He has refereed England vs NZ on 7 November 2009 in the 4 Nations.

References

External links 
RFL profile
Thierry Alibert Stats
Thierry Alibert SL Ref 09

French rugby league referees
Living people
1970 births
Rugby League World Cup referees
Sportspeople from Toulouse